Thomas O'Neil may refer to:
 Thomas O'Neil (cricketer), New Zealand cricketer
 Thomas F. O'Neil, chairman of RKO General studios
 Thomas Michael O'Neil, American physicist 
 Tommy O'Neil, English footballer

See also
 Thomas O'Neill (disambiguation)
 Thomas Neill (disambiguation)